Allen Shellenberger (September 15, 1969 – August 13, 2009) was an American drummer who played in the band Lit.

Early life and career
Shellenberger was born to Paul Shellenberger and Connie James. He founded Lit in 1988 in Fullerton, California alongside brothers A. Jay and Jeremy Popoff and bassist Kevin Baldes. Before settling on the name Lit, other names that the band went by were Razzle and Stain. He remained a member of the band until his death in 2009.

Illness and death
Lit announced on May 5, 2008 that Shellenberger was diagnosed with a brain tumor. Doctors at the Cedars-Sinai Maxine Dunitz Neurosurgical Institute confirmed that it was a malignant glioma, which had favorably responded to radiation and chemotherapy treatment but was inoperable. His treatments were documented in a piece on ABC World News Tonight. Shellenberger's diagnosis led to the band cancelling their scheduled tour dates with Kiss. The band held a benefit concert for Shellenberger at the House of Blues in Anaheim, California on July 26, 2008. The concert also featured other bands such as Sugar Ray and Handsome Devil. No Doubt's drummer Adrian Young filled in for Shellenberger for a couple of songs. Both drummers also played at the same time for a few songs. The concert was Shellenberger's final show with Lit, as he died from the disease on August 13, 2009, a month before his 40th birthday. He was survived by his parents and daughter.

The remaining members of Lit released a statement the day after Shellenberger's death: "To anything for anyone. Words cannot begin to express how much he will be missed. This was our brother and not a day will go by that we won't think about him. Right now we're trying to find the balance of mourning his loss and celebrating his life. Allen has experienced more in his 39 years than most people dream of in 10 lifetimes. This is a tremendous loss for us, our fans and also for Allen's family who took such good care of him during his battle with cancer".

Drum set and other gear
Allen mainly used OCDP (Orange County Drums and Percussion) throughout his career. He also used Paiste Cymbals. His setup was one snare, one rack tom, and a floor tom. His cymbal setup was two crash cymbals, a pair of hi-hats, and a ride cymbal.

Discography

With Lit
 Tripping the Light Fantastic (1997) (reissued in 1999)
 A Place in the Sun (1999)
 Atomic (2001)
 Lit (2004)

References

1969 births
2009 deaths
American rock drummers
Deaths from brain cancer in the United States
Deaths from cancer in California
Musicians from Long Beach, California
20th-century American drummers
American male drummers
20th-century American male musicians